is a 1957 Japanese film directed by Ishirō Honda.

Cast
 Hiroshi Koizumi
 Yumi Shirakawa
 Keiko Tsushima
 Toshiro Mifune
 Kamatari Fujiwara
 Takashi Shimura
 Shizue Natsukawa
 Yuriko Hide
 Tamae Kiyokawa
 Takeo Oikawa
 Hirota Kisaragi
 Yoshifumi Tajima
 Sumiko Koizumi
 Yū Fujiki

References

Bibliography

 

1957 films
Japanese drama films
Films directed by Ishirō Honda
1950s Japanese films